Choriolaus sabinoensis is a species of beetle in the family Cerambycidae. It was described by Knull in 1954.

References

Choriolaus
Beetles described in 1954